Fade is the thirteenth full-length album by American indie rock band Yo La Tengo. It was produced by John McEntire, instead of Roger Moutenot, who had produced all their albums since 1993's Painful. It was recorded at Soma in Chicago, in the summer of 2012. It was released on January 15, 2013.

Release 

The "Stupid Things" EP was released on 12" and CD on September 25, 2012, prior to the album release. It contains a different version of the title song. "Ohm" was released as a limited edition triple 12" in "a printed flat in a 4-box poly shower curtain display case" in July 2013 On November 5th the 12" of "Super Kiwi" was released. The title song was recorded during the Fade sessions with John McEntire. On the B-side there is a cover of the Beach Boys' "A Day in the Life of a Tree".

Fade debuted at number 26 on the Billboard 200 chart upon its release in January 2013, with sales of 14,000 copies. It marked the band's all-time chart peak as well as the first time a Yo La Tengo record has entered the top 40.

There are three different editions of the vinyl LP available: the Standard Edition, another which comes with the Fade CD included, and a "Deluxe Limited Edition" that contains a bonus 7" with two extra songs and an exclusive download track. The "Deluxe Limited Edition" 2-CD set contains a special CD called Fade Out with 14 bonus tracks and four additional downloads (the 12" version of "Stupid Things" and three mixes from "Oriole" from the "Ohm" triple 12" edition).

A DVD called Tree, animated by Jim Woodring, was released on January 14, 2014. It contains an animated short of 5:20 minutes, based on artwork from Fade. The song "Super Kiwi" is featured. The packaging comes with three soft vinyl figurines, sculpted by Tomohiro Yasui, representing the band members, and a bonus comic on the back.

Music videos 

Donick Cary (Simpsons, Letterman, Parks and Recreation) of Sugarshack Animation (Sugarshackanimation.com) directed the videos for "Ohm" and its sequel "Is That Enough" featuring Fred Willard  Emily Hubley directed the "Before We Run" animated video. Phil Morrison, long time Yo La Tengo collaborator and film director, did the video for "I'll Be Around", starring Mac McCaughan of Superchunk and the members of Yo La Tengo. This marks the first proper video clip from the band since "Sugarcube" (also directed by Morrison).

Track listing

Personnel
Yo La Tengo

Ira Kaplan - vocals, guitars, keyboards, synthesizers
Georgia Hubley - drums, guitars, vocals, keyboards, percussion
James McNew - bass, guitars, vocals

Mastered by Greg Calbi at Sterling Sound

Additional musicians
Andy Baker - trombone ("Cornelia and Jane", "Before We Run")
Brian Drye - trombone ("Before We Run")
Robert Fisher - viola ("Is That Enough", "Stupid Things", "Before We Run")
Jeff Hermanson - trumpet ("Before We Run")
Todd Matthews - violin ("Is That Enough", "Stupid Things", "Before We Run")
Rob Mazurek - cornet ("Cornelia and Jane", "Before We Run")
John McEntire - percussion ("Ohm") and vibes ("Two Trains")
Michael McGinnis - baritone saxophone ("Before We Run")
Jeff Parker - string arrangement ("Is That Enough")
William Porter - cello ("Is That Enough", "Before We Run")
Phyllis Sanders - violin ("Is That Enough", "Stupid Things", "Before We Run")

Art
Design by Mark One
Photographs by Carlie Armstrong

References

External links 

 

2013 albums
Yo La Tengo albums